An act of entrustment is one of four essential requirements which must be in place under European Union law in order to ensure that the financial compensation paid to an organisation providing a public service is not treated as "state aid" as defined by the Treaty on the Functioning of the European Union.

Article 106(2) of the Treaty (formerly Article 86(2) of the European Communities Treaty), states that:

In its judgment in the case of Altmark Trans GmbH and Regierungsprasidium Magdeburg v. Nahverkehrsgesellschaft Altmark GmbH (the Altmark case), the Court of Justice of the European Union held that public sector compensation does not constitute state aid if the following four criteria are all met:
 The organisation receiving funds (compensation) must actually have public service obligations to discharge, and the obligations must be clearly defined;
 The parameters on the basis of which the compensation is calculated must be established in advance in an objective and transparent manner;
 The compensation must not exceed what is necessary to cover all or part of the costs incurred in the discharge of the public sector obligations, taking into account the relevant receipts and a reasonable profit;
 Either,
 – The undertaking which is to discharge the public service obligations must have been chosen pursuant to a public procurement procedure which would allow for the selection of the bidder capable of providing the services at the least cost to the community; or
– The level of compensation needed must be determined on the basis of an analysis of the costs which a typical undertaking, well run and adequately equipped, would have incurred.

The European Commission has stated  that an "act of entrustment" is necessary in order to set out the public service obligations of the undertaking and must have been committed to the organisation through an official act having legal force under the national law of the relevant EU member state. There need not be any specific legal framework covering acts of entrustment, but the act must extend sufficiently to create an obligation or accountability: permission, such as legal recognition or regulatory approval would not be sufficient. The obligation may be set out in legislation, the terms of a contract or in certain cases in a grant agreement. The act of entrustment should, in particular, state the nature, territorial scope and duration of the public service obligations, the organisation concerned, and the nature of any exclusive or special rights which the organisation may be able to exercise, along with the mechanism for calculating the level of compensation.

References

European Union law